Lowell Jay Milken (born November 29, 1948) is an American businessman, philanthropist, and the co-founder and chairman of the Milken Family Foundation. He is also the founder of the National Institute for Excellence in Teaching, TAP System for Teacher and Student Advancement as well as co-founder of Knowledge Universe, a provider of early childhood education. Milken is a former senior vice-president in the junk bond-trading operation of Drexel Burnham Lambert, headed by his brother Michael Milken.

Lowell Milken has founded several more nonprofit organizations, including the Lowell Milken Family Foundation and the Lowell Milken Center for Unsung Heroes. In 2000, he was named one of America's most generous philanthropists by Worth magazine. In 1985, he created the Milken Educator Awards, widely considered the preeminent teacher recognition program in the nation.

Early life 

Lowell Jay Milken was born on November 29, 1948, in Los Angeles and grew up in Encino, California. He is the second son of Bernard and Ferne Milken; his older brother Michael was born in 1946 and a sister Joni born in 1958. The family moved to the San Fernando Valley in 1953, where Lowell attended schools in the California public school system including Hesby Elementary School in Encino, Portola Junior High School in Tarzana, and Birmingham High School in Van Nuys.

Milken graduated Phi Beta Kappa and summa cum laude from the University of California, Berkeley. He earned a J.D. degree from the University of California, Los Angeles, where he was a member of the Order of the Coif honor society and an editor of the UCLA Law Review. Milken graduated in the top ten percent of his class at UCLA School of Law.

Business career 

After graduating from UCLA Law, Milken joined the law firm of Irell & Manella, where he specialized in business and tax law. He spent four years working as an associate at the Los Angeles-based firm. Milken particularly enjoyed and excelled at the tax-study lunches at Irell & Manella, where a senior attorney at the firm presented a complicated case and the lawyers in attendance attempted to come up with unique solutions.

In 1979, he joined Drexel Burnham Lambert's High Yield and Convertible Bond Department, also known as the "junk bond" department. His brother Michael Milken had moved the operation to Los Angeles the year before, and he hired Lowell to serve as a departmental senior vice-president until he resigned in 1989. His duties were reported to be "mostly administrative", but he also provided financial analysis of companies. Lowell was most interested in bankruptcies and distressed finances where he was able to utilize his tax policy experience from Irell & Manella. He was not a registered representative with any securities exchange.

In March 1989, after a long investigation, the government indicted Michael with 98 counts of racketeering and fraud. The indictment also named Lowell in two charges of racketeering and 11 counts of fraud. Michael pleaded guilty and went to prison. As part of that deal, the government dropped charges against Lowell Milken, but in March 1991, he was barred from working in the securities industry as part of a settlement with the Securities and Exchange Commission. It has been suggested that the government indicted Lowell in order to put pressure on Michael to settle the case against him, a tactic condemned as unethical by some legal scholars. "I am troubled by – and other scholars are troubled by – the notion of putting relatives on the bargaining table," said Vivian Berger, a professor at Columbia University Law School, in a 1990 interview with The New York Times. In articles in the Los Angeles Times and The New York Times published in 1990, Lowell was characterized as an "unassuming family man" being used as a "bargaining chip", indicted only to put pressure on his brother.

In 1992, Lowell Milken funded $1.6 million to back a lawsuit against author James B. Stewart for a passage written in Stewart's book, Den of Thieves, which was about the insider trading scandals during the 1980s. In the lawsuit, Michael F. Armstrong, the criminal defense lawyer who represented Lowell Milken, alleged that the book wrongly accused Armstrong of preparing a false affidavit for a witness to sign to exonerate Lowell Milken. An Associate Justice of the Supreme Court in New York found that the passage concerning Armstrong and the affidavit were substantially true and dismissed the charges.

Lowell later became chairman and a shareholder of Heron International, a real estate firm in London, England. He acquired a majority interest in the company in the early 1990s. Since the late 1990s, he has been chairman and a major investor in National Realty Trust Inc.

In 1996, Lowell co-founded Knowledge Universe with Michael Milken and Larry Ellison. In 2003, they became the sole owners of the company. In the United States, Knowledge Universe Education Holdings Inc. became the largest early childhood education company and operated under the KinderCare Learning Centers, Knowledge Beginnings, CCLC, The Grove School, Champions and Cambridge Schools brands. Internationally, it oversees early childhood education, K-12 education and post-secondary education programs and is headquartered in Singapore. Lowell served as vice-chairman of Knowledge Universe Education and he is chairman of Knowledge Universe Education Holdings Inc. In July 2015, Knowledge Universe Education was sold to Switzerland-based Partners Group for undisclosed terms.

Philanthropy 

Lowell Milken co-founded Milken Family Foundation in 1982 and serves as its chairman. He also established the Lowell Milken Family Foundation in 1986 to support and provide funding for organizations and initiatives that strengthen communities through education and lifelong learning.

He created the Milken Educator Awards in 1985. First presented in 1987, the award program works with state departments of education to identify teachers, principals and education specialists who are improving student achievement, making significant contributions to a school's level of excellence and elevating the teaching profession. Known as the "Oscars of Teaching," as of the 2021-22 school year, the National Milken Educator Award Network counts more than 2,900 educators among the recipients of the Milken Educator Award.

In 1990, Milken founded the Milken Archive of Jewish Music, a project to discover, record, preserve and disseminate the music of the American Jewish experience. The archive holds more than 600 recordings, 200 oral histories and 50 albums, all documenting the Jewish contribution to American music, from the liturgical music of Sephardi immigrants during the colonial era through the hits of the Yiddish stage and the jazz, blues and rock eras.

In 1999, Milken founded the TAP System for Teacher and Student Advancement, a comprehensive school reform currently impacting more than 275,000 educators and 2.7 million students across the country. The system is based on four integrated and aligned elements: Multiple careers paths, continuous school-based professional development, instructionally-focused accountability, and performance-based compensation for educators. In 2005, Milken founded an independent public charity to support and manage the TAP System, The National Institute for Excellence in Teaching (NIET), and has since served as its chairman.

The Lowell Milken Center for Unsung Heroes was established by Lowell Milken in 2007 in partnership with Kansas Milken Educator Norman Conard. The public nonprofit organization discovers, develops and communicates the stories of unsung heroes who have made a profound and positive difference on the course of history and includes a 6,000-square-foot museum space with permanent and rotating exhibitions. In May 2016, the Lowell Milken Center for Unsung Heroes opened a museum in Fort Scott, Kansas.

Milken has partnered with the Prostate Cancer Foundation to present the Lowell Milken Prostate Cancer Foundation Young Investigator Award to scientists for work in the field of prostate cancer.

The Lowell Milken Institute for Business Law and Policy was founded at UCLA School of Law in 2011 with a gift from Milken of $10 million.

In 2014, with an initial endowment of two million dollars from Lowell Milken Family Foundation, the Hoffmitz Milken Center for Typography was established at ArtCenter College of Design in Pasadena, California. In 2017, Milken gave an additional $2 million gift to the Hoffmitz Milken Center. 

In 2020, Milken gave a $6.75 million endowment from the Lowell Milken Family Foundation to UCLA to establish the Lowell Milken Center for Music of American Jewish Experience. The center opened in January 2021 as part of the Herb Alpert School of Music.

In 2021, Milken donated $3.7 million to establish the Program on Philanthropy and Nonprofits at UCLA School of Law, which focuses on research, training and policy.

Awards 

In 2000, Milken was named one of America's most generous philanthropists by Worth magazine. His work in business and philanthropy has been recognized by the National Association of State Boards of Education, the Horace Mann League and the National Association of Secondary School Principals.

During the 2004 event "Only in America: Jewish Music in a Land of Freedom", Milken was honored by the Jewish Theological Seminary of America for his contribution to Jewish culture in the creation of Milken Archive. In 2009, the Hebrew Union College in Los Angeles presented Milken with a Doctor of Humane Letters, honoris causa. Milken was honored as one of UCLA School of Law's 2009 Alumnus of the Year for his accomplishments in public and community service, particularly in the area of education and school reform.

In May 2015, Milken accepted an honorary Doctorate of Humane Letters from Chapman University's George L. Argyros School of Business and Economics at Chapman University. The Education Commission of the States honored Milken as the 2017 recipient of the James Bryant Conant Award. The award is named for the co-founder of Education Commission of the States and former president of Harvard University, and recognizes outstanding individual contributions to American education.

References 

1948 births
American billionaires
Jewish American philanthropists
Living people
Businesspeople from Los Angeles
Philanthropists from California
UCLA School of Law alumni
University of California, Berkeley alumni
People from the San Fernando Valley
21st-century American Jews